On 17 September 1982 a car bomb exploded near Lycée Carnot in Paris, France, injuring 51 people. The attack was claimed by the Lebanese Armed Revolutionary Factions (FARL) in the context of anti-Israeli terrorism. The attack was not fatal, though most of the wounded were Carnot students. The bomb exploded in the car of Amos Manel, an Israeli diplomat, a Peugeot 504. The FARL had previously committed the assassinations of American lieutenant colonel Charles R. Ray in January and that of Israeli diplomat Yacov Barsimantov in April, both of whom were shot dead in Paris, amongst other attacks - some of which were done with the assistance of the Action Directe group. The attack happened on the eve of Rosh Hashanah and a few months after the Israeli invasion of Lebanon.

See also
 List of terrorist incidents in France

References

 

1982 crimes in France
1982 in international relations
September car bombing
September 1982 car bombing
Car and truck bombings in France
France–Israel relations
Improvised explosive device bombings in 1982
September 1982 car
September 1982 crimes
September 1982 events in Europe 
Terrorist incidents in France in 1982